Ames Manufacturing Company was a manufacturer of swords, tools and cutlery in Chicopee, Massachusetts, as well as an iron and bronze foundry. They were a major provider of side arms, swords, light artillery, and heavy ordnance for the Union in the American Civil War. They also cast a number of bronze statues which can be found throughout New England.

Company history 

The Ames Manufacturing Company has its origins in a factory established in 1774 in Chelmsford, Massachusetts by the Ames family. Brothers Nathan P. Ames Jr. and James T. Ames moved their tool and cutlery business to a new industrial town on the Chicopee River near Springfield, Massachusetts in 1829. They were invited by Edmund Dwight, who owned textile mills nearby. The Ames company soon moved to manufacturing swords for the federal government and state militias.

As the town of Chicopee was formed in 1848, the Ames brothers were leaders in the new community. Upon the death of Nathan P. Ames in 1847, ownership of the company turned to younger brother James Tyler Ames.

Iron and bronze foundries

By 1835, the company was creating works in brass and bronze, and in 1845, an iron foundry was added. The company used the foundries for casting statuary as well for producing as military cannons and cannonballs.

The bronze doors of the East Wing of the United States Capitol and Daniel Chester French's Minuteman statue at the Lexington-Concord bridge were cast at the Ames company. Other statues included large equestrian statues of George Washington (at the Boston Public Garden and in Washington, D.C.), a statue of Benjamin Franklin (Boston), and a statue of Major John Mason.

When the Mexican War came, the foundry's primary output switched to armament.

Civil War
Upon the secession of the South and the formation of the Confederate States of America, the Union lost access to its southern arsenals. Therefore, independent arms manufacturers were crucial to the success of the Union army. Ames was one of the Union's most important manufacturers of side arms, swords, and light artillery, and the third largest producer of heavy ordnance.

Post-war diversification and decline

In addition to producing military equipment for many years, including (in addition to swords) cannons, cannonballs, it also produced sewing machine and bicycle parts in the later 19th century. The company was a major supplier of bicycles to the Overman Wheel Company from 1883-1887. The sword manufacturing business was formally separated into an independent company in 1881.

By 1907, the Ames foundries had been purchased by Chicopee's A.G. Spalding Company.

Surviving buildings
The historic Ames Company factory, located at 5-7 Springfield Street in Chicopee, Massachusetts, is a complex of connected industrial buildings, the oldest of which date to 1847.  Most of the older elements are brick in construction, and range in height from one to four stories.
This complex was added to the National Register of Historic Places in 1983.  The largest surviving buildings have been converted into residences.

See also
 Model 1832 Foot Artillery Sword
 National Register of Historic Places listings in Hampden County, Massachusetts
 Field artillery in the American Civil War

Notes

References

Further reading

External links
 Stearns-Ames collection, (ca. 1838-1894) in the Smithsonian Archives of American Art

Industrial buildings completed in 1847
Industrial buildings and structures on the National Register of Historic Places in Massachusetts
Massachusetts in the American Civil War
National Register of Historic Places in Hampden County, Massachusetts
1847 establishments in Massachusetts
Foundries in the United States
1907 disestablishments in Massachusetts
Manufacturing companies disestablished in 1907
1907 mergers and acquisitions
American Civil War artillery